Dwight King (born July 5, 1989) is a Canadian former professional ice hockey left winger. He played in the National Hockey League (NHL) with the Los Angeles Kings and the Montreal Canadiens. He was a member of the Kings' Stanley Cup championship teams in 2012 and 2014.

Playing career

Los Angeles Kings
King was drafted 109th overall in the 2007 NHL Entry Draft by the Los Angeles Kings. He spent five seasons with the Lethbridge Hurricanes (spanning from 2004–05 to 2008–09) in the Western Hockey League (WHL).

King made his professional debut during the 2009–10 season, playing 20 games in the ECHL with the Ontario Reign, and the remainder of the regular season and playoffs with the Kings' American Hockey League (AHL) affiliate, the Manchester Monarchs.

King remained with Manchester for the beginning of the 2010–11 AHL season before being recalled to the NHL by Los Angeles on November 16, 2010 to replace the injured Alexei Ponikarovsky on their active roster. On November 17, 2010 he played in his first NHL game when he suited up with the Kings for a home game against the Columbus Blue Jackets.

On February 12, 2012, King scored his first career National Hockey League goal against the Dallas Stars. He went on to score five goals with three assists in 20 games during the 2012 Stanley Cup playoffs as the Kings won their first ever Stanley Cup championship.

On October 24, 2013, King completed his first ever National Hockey League hat trick against the Phoenix Coyotes. King won his second Stanley Cup when the Kings defeated the New York Rangers on June 13, 2014. Appearing in 26 games during the 2014 Stanley Cup Playoffs, King scored three goals and eight assists.

On July 30, 2014, King and the Los Angeles Kings avoided arbitration by agreeing to a three-year contract worth $5.95 million. He scored 13 goals to go with 13 assists for the Kings during the 2014–15 NHL Season. His production would soon decline in subsequent seasons, scoring 7 goals in 2015–16, and 8 in 2016–17.

Montreal Canadiens
On March 1, 2017, King was traded to the Montreal Canadiens for a conditional 2018 fourth-round draft pick. Continuing to play his role as a fourth-line fixture, King registered 1 goal in 17 games to end the regular season. He went scoreless in 6 playoff games with the Canadiens before leaving as a free agent.

Europe
On August 14, 2017, King signed his first contract overseas, agreeing to a two-year deal with Avtomobilist Yekaterinburg of the Kontinental Hockey League (KHL). Following the 2017–18 season, in which he contributed with 6 goals and 14 points in 49 games, King was released from the remaining year of his contract with Yekaterinburg and signed with the Graz 99ers of the Austrian Hockey League (EBEL) on August 3, 2018.

Personal life

King is of Métis heritage. His older brother D. J. King also played professional hockey. King played minor hockey in Saskatchewan for the Beardy's Blackhawks. The team King played on is the only program in Canada run by and based in a First Nations reserve. Despite being run by a reserve, the team was not completely made up of First Nations people; King estimated the team was approximately 50 percent First Nations. King's hometown is Meadow Lake, Saskatchewan, where he resides during the summers. He shared the 2014 Stanley Cup that he won with the LA Kings in Saskatchewan, with his wife Lauren and daughter, Grace.

His mother Donna is a secretary and his father Dwayne is a truck driver.

King has started to venture into operating an indoor golf course in Meadow Lake called Kingdom Golf.

Career statistics

Regular season and playoffs

International

Awards and honors

References

External links

1989 births
Living people
Avtomobilist Yekaterinburg players
Canadian expatriate ice hockey players in Austria
Canadian ice hockey centres
Canadian Métis people
Graz 99ers players
Ice hockey people from Saskatchewan
Lethbridge Hurricanes players
Los Angeles Kings draft picks
Los Angeles Kings players
Manchester Monarchs (AHL) players
Métis sportspeople
Montreal Canadiens players
Ontario Reign (ECHL) players
Sportspeople from Meadow Lake, Saskatchewan
Stanley Cup champions